Appollo may refer to:

 Appollo Hospital, K.G.Koppal, Mysore, India
 Appollo Fibres Limited, merged to form Indian Petrochemicals Corporation Limited
 Appollo, codename for v4.0 of Railo, a web-scripting compiler
 Idea-Fly Appollo, a drone from Idea-Fly UAV
 Appollo Co., Ltd, a sanitary ware company in Guangzhou, China

See also
 Apollo (disambiguation)
 Appolo (disambiguation)
 Apolo (disambiguation)